Ören is a village in the Besni District, Adıyaman Province, Turkey. Its population is 437 (2021).

The hamlet of Yeşilova is attached to the village.

References

Villages in Besni District